Rouillard can refer to:
Carole Rouillard (born 1960), Canadian long-distance runner
Pierre Louis Rouillard (1820–1881), French sculptor